The 113th Engineer Battalion is an Engineer unit of the Indiana Army National Guard with a record of accomplishment in both peace and war. Their missions include providing sustained engineer support across the full spectrum of military operations and engineering. The 113th Engineer Battalion traces its lineage to the 1st Separate Battalion Engineers in 1917.

The Battalion nickname is "Ironmen."

Current units 
 Headquarters and Headquarters Company
 Forward Support Company
 713th Company (Sapper)
 1313th Company (Horizontal Construction)
 1413th Company (Vertical Construction)

Transformation 
With the Army Structure (ARSTRUC) announcement, 113th Engineer Battalion realigned into the Echelon Above Brigade formation while retaining its heraldry and name, aligned under the 219th Engineer Brigade, 38th Infantry Division.

Unit History

World War I 

Prior to 1917, the United States Army was smaller than 13 of the nations already involved in the War. On the day the United States entered the War, the Army consisted of 127,151 Soldiers supplemented by 181,620 National Guardsmen. To build a proper Army, Congress approved a $3 billion budget and passed the Selective Service Act of 1917. 4 million men were drafted into service, and the Army expanded significantly. New units were activated, and existing units were reassigned to meet the Army's needs.
Among these new units was the 38th Infantry Division, previously the 17th Division, activated as a National Guard Division in August 1917. National Guard units from Indiana, Kentucky, and West Virginia were transported to Camp Shelby, Mississippi.
On 16 September 1917, Company M of 3rd Regiment (sans Officers), Kentucky Infantry was designated the 1st Separate Battalion Engineers and assigned to the 38th Infantry Division. Training began in October 1917, and continued for the next ten months. During this training, the unit was redesignated the 113th Engineer Regiment.
Once their training was completed, the 113th arrived in France in October 1918, during the height of the Meuse-Argonne Offensive. While most of the 38th ID was stripped down to serve as replacements for units already in combat, the 113th Engineers assisted in constructing bases and infrastructure for the American Expeditionary Forces, of which nearly 10,000 soldiers were still arriving every day. From Brest, France, the 113th and other engineering units built nearly 1,000 miles of standard-gauge tracks and over 100,000 miles of telephone and telegraph lines.
After Armistice Day, 11 November 1918, the 38th Infantry Division was assigned to the city of Konz in Allied-occupied Rhineland. There they remained until they returned to the United States in Spring of 1919.

Interwar Period (1919–41) 
After returning home, the 113th entered an inactive status while the United States rapidly demobilized and returned to a peacetime footing. However, the experiences of the War convinced the War Department and Congress to retain a reserve structure to improve America's readiness in future wars. A series of Amendments to the National Defense Act of 1916 included adding the National Guard to the Regular Army's structure when in federal service. The names, numbers, flags, and records of the divisions that served in World War I, including the 113th Engineers, were to be preserved for future use.
The 113th was transitioned back to active status in 1921 as the 113th Engineer Combat Regiment. By November 1921 the Indiana National Guard had approximately 4,000 actively drilling National Guardsmen. By March 1923, the 38th Infantry Division Headquarters was federally recognized and established in Indianapolis. It was at this time that the 76th Infantry Brigade, the 139th and 150th Field Artillery Regiments, and the 113th Engineer Regiment were allotted solely to Indiana.

In the coming decades, the 113th Engineers served during the Ohio River flood of 1937, assisting in evacuation efforts and building more than seventy storage reservoirs to reduce Ohio River flood heights, a project that would continue into the early 1940s. The 113th also served with other National Guard units in Wisconsin during the 1940 Armistice Day Blizzard, assisting in rescue efforts for survivors trapped in 27 inches of snow, as well as rebuilding the telegraph/telephone poles and buildings that had been damaged in the 50–80 mph winds.

As France fell to Nazi Germany, and tensions continued to grow with Imperial Japan, the 38th Infantry Division was once again ordered into federal service.
The 113th Engineers were mobilized on 17 January 1941 as the 113th Engineer Combat Battalion, and began their training at Camp Shelby. Eleven months later, Imperial Japan bombed Pearl Harbor, and the United States entered World War II.

Training for World War II 
The 38th Infantry Division continued to train for three more years, before embarking to Hawaii on 3 January 1944, arriving on 17 January. There the 113th Engineers were assigned to the defense of Oahu and received jungle training. In July 1944, the 38th embarked to New Guinea. From July to November 1944, they conducted final combat rehearsals, made realistic by the presence of Japanese soldiers bypassed during the Western New Guinea campaign.
With rehearsals complete, the 38th sailed for Leyte, landing in December 1944. The 113th Engineers brought with them 400 tons of assault and pioneering equipment, 140 tons of 30-day engineer supplies, and a complete "Bailey Bridge" unit weighing over 89 tons. For two months the 113th Engineers assisted in the defense of Leyte, including defending Buri, Bayug, and San Pablo airstrips from Japanese paratroopers until 4 January 1945.

Philippines Campaign

The 38th then embarked for Luzon, the largest island of the Philippines and the site of the Bataan Death March three years earlier. The 113th Engineers landed in the Zambales Province without any opposition on 29 January. For the next two days, they assisted in securing and building defensive structures at the San Marcelino airstrip and the port facilities at Olongapo, as well as the Grande Island in Subic Bay after a separate amphibious landing. While the 151st Infantry Regiment secured Subic Bay, the 152nd Infantry Regiment and 113th Engineers were given the mission to drive eastward along an irregular and unimproved Route 7. A section of Route 7 that the 152nd and 113th were traveling on went through the rugged Zambales mountains at the northern base of the Bataan peninsula – a path Americans called 'Zig-Zag Pass.' It was there that the Japanese 39th Infantry Regiment decided to make their last stand. 
The Japanese had dug foxholes, trenches, and tunnels throughout the mountains, and relied on the thick vegetation to cover their positions. On the morning of 1 February, the 152nd and the 113th ran into a Japanese strongpoint at 'Horseshoe Bend,' the first major Zig-Zag Pass obstacle. Two days of heavy fighting followed, resulting in high casualties and stopping all eastward progress. The nearby 34th Infantry Regiment was ordered to assist the 152nd and 113th, but after six days of suffering heavy casualties they were forced to disengage. The 151st linked up with the 152nd and 113th the next day to continue the battle, but fighting remained fierce for three more days. However, the Japanese began to give more and more ground until they were finally overrun on 8 February. Afterwards, the 152nd and 113th continued eastwards, finally linking up with XIV Corps on 14 February. Through 8 days of fighting, it was estimated that the 151st, 152nd, and 113th killed about 2,400 of the 2,800 Japanese defenders in Zig-Zag Pass.
For the next seven days, the 113th pushed along the route of the March of Death to Bagac. The Bataan Peninsula was secured on 21 February – the 38th Infantry Division's rapid drive through Route 7 and across the peninsula was critical to General MacArthur's campaign plan to retake the Philippines.

Over the next few months, the 113th would assist in the final liberation of the Philippines from Imperial Japan, securing Corregidor on 24 February and Caballo Island on 27 March. In April, the 38th Infantry Division advanced directly into the Zambales mountains, pushing out the last of the dug-in Japanese defenders. The 113th Engineers were instrumental in surrounding the retreating Japanese and cutting off their withdrawal routes.
After the Zambales were cleared, the 38th moved east of Manila, where they continued fighting into May. By 30 June, all effective Japanese positions had been broken. The 113th Engineers spent the rest of the war assisting in hunting down bypassed Japanese soldiers, as well as improving defensive capabilities of American and Philippine positions. This concluded with Japan's unconditional surrender on 14 August, bringing an end to the 113th Engineers' unbroken stretch of 198 consecutive days in combat. Combined, elements of the 38th Infantry Division killed 26,469 enemy combatants and took 1,411 prisoners. As news of the war's end spread to the remaining Japanese defenders, that number soon swelled to 13,000 prisoners by October.

Post-War and Cold War 
The 113th Engineers were alerted on 15 September 1945 that they were going to return to the United States and demobilize, and were relieved on 5 October. They sailed to Camp Anza, California. Final demobilization and deactivation was completed on 9 November 1945.
Subordinate units of the 38th ID were organized and reconstituted, swelled by the large numbers of World War II veterans. The 113th Engineers were reorganized on 6 October 1946, and were federally recognized on 5 March 1947. 38th Division headquarters were once again in Indianapolis, and Annual Training began being held at Camp Atterbury in 1948.

During the Cold War, the 113th Engineers served in the Strategic Reserve to support the Active Army in the event of a full-scale war with the Soviet Union.
The 113th continued to serve the home front, being called up for State Active Duty during the Perfect Circle Strike of 1955, as well as the 1965 Palm Sunday tornado outbreak.

Global War on Terrorism 

The 113th Engineer Battalion was deployed to Mosul, Iraq in support of Operation Iraqi Freedom in 2004.  They conducted Soldier Readiness Processing at Camp Atterbury in late 2004, and arrived in-country between mid-December 2004 to early-January 2005.  They operated in Nineveh Governorate, Iraq for the entirety of their 12-month deployment, engaging with enemy forces in combat several times. The 113th was home by the end of 2005 with no combat deaths.

In 2009, the 1613th Engineer Company deployed to Jalalabad, Afghanistan in support of Operation Enduring Freedom. The same year, the 1313th Engineer Company deployed to Mosul, Iraq.

In March 2012, the Battalion was awarded the Valorous Unit Award for their performance in Operation Founding Fathers during Iraq's 2005 elections.

In 2011, the 713th Engineer Company was alerted they were deploying to Kandahar, Afghanistan. They mobilized for training in October, and arrived in-country in November 2011. Their mission for the 10-1/2-month deployment was to patrol roads and clear roadside IEDs around Forward Operating Base (FOB) Frontenac in support of Operation Enduring Freedom.

In two separate incidents, the 713th Engineer Company suffered six casualties during this deployment. The first was on 6 January 2012, when the third vehicle in an eight-vehicle convoy hit a roadside IED. SSG Jonathan Metzger, SPC Robert Tauteris Jr., SPC Brian Leonhardt (posthumously promoted to SGT), and SPC Christopher Patterson were killed in the explosion, with a fifth soldier, PFC Douglas Rachowicz suffering multiple injuries as a result of the blast. Six months later on 17 July 2012, two more 713th soldiers, SPC Sergio Perez and SPC Nicholas Taylor, were killed in action during a mounted route clearance attack.
Within the Indiana National Guard, the six 713th Engineer Company soldiers who were killed during the 2012 deployment are remembered as 'The Sapper Six.'

In September 2019, the 113th Engineer Battalion mobilized for a deployment to Kuwait, Saudi Arabia, and Afghanistan. They returned home September 2020.

Distinctive unit insignia 
 Description
A silver metal and enamel device 1 5/32 inches (2.94 cm) in height, consisting of a shield, crest and motto.
 Symbolism
The silver triple-towered castle, taken from the arms of Saint-Dizier in France, denotes the battalion's World War I service. The shield is red and the charge is white, the colors of the U.S. Army Corps of Engineers. The crest is that of the Indiana Army National Guard.
 Background
The distinctive unit insignia was originally approved on 26 May 1928 for the 113th Engineer Regiment, consisting of the shield and motto. The design was changed to add the crest on 5 June 1936. It was re-designated for the 113th Engineer Combat Battalion on 19 November 1943. The insignia was once again re-designated for the 113th Engineer Battalion on 23 September 1963.

Notes 

Engineer battalions of the United States Army